Morchella tibetica is a species of fungus in the family Morchellaceae. Described as new to science in 1987, it is found in Tibet, where it grows in deciduous woodland.

References

External links

tibetica
Edible fungi
Fungi described in 1987
Fungi of China